Love over Gold is the fourth studio album by British rock band Dire Straits, released on 24 September 1982 by Vertigo Records internationally and by Warner Bros. Records in the United States. The album featured two singles: "Private Investigations," which reached No. 2 on the UK Singles Chart, and "Industrial Disease," which reached No. 9 on Billboards Hot Mainstream Rock Tracks chart in the United States. The title track was released as a single two years later in its live version, and reached #15 in France, #29 in New Zealand, #43 in Netherlands and #50 in the band's native United Kingdom. The album reached number one on album charts in Australia, Austria, Italy, New Zealand, Norway and the United Kingdom, as well as number 19 in the United States. Love over Gold was later certified gold in the United States, platinum in France and Germany and double-platinum in Canada and the United Kingdom.

Background
Following the end of the On Location Tour on 6 July 1981 in Luxembourg, Mark Knopfler began writing songs for Dire Straits' next album. Alan Clark (keyboards) and Hal Lindes (guitar), who joined the band for the On Location Tour, would also be involved with the new album. This was also the last album to feature drummer Pick Withers.

Knopfler was inspired to write "Telegraph Road," the album's 14-minute centerpiece, after Dire Straits' tour bus drove for miles along Telegraph Road in Detroit:

Recording
Love over Gold was recorded at the Power Station in New York from 8 March to 11 June 1982. Knopfler produced the album, with Neil Dorfsman as his engineer—the first in a long line of collaborations between the two.

Knopfler used several guitars during the sessions, including four Schecter Stratocasters—two red, one blue, and one sunburst—a black Schecter Telecaster, an Ovation classical guitar on "Private Investigations" and "Love over Gold," a custom Erlewine Automatic on "Industrial Disease" and his 1937 National steel guitar on "Telegraph Road." Knopfler also used Ovation twelve- and six-string acoustic guitars during the recording.

Several songs were written and recorded during the Love over Gold sessions that were not released on the album. "Private Dancer" was originally planned for the album, with all but the vocal tracks being recorded. Knopfler decided that a female voice would be more appropriate and handed the song to Tina Turner for her comeback album, Private Dancer. "The Way It Always Starts" ended up on Knopfler's soundtrack to the film Local Hero, with vocals sung by Gerry Rafferty. "Badges, Posters, Stickers and T-Shirts" was cut from the album and later released in the UK as a B-side to "Private Investigations" and in the United States as the B-side to "Industrial Disease." It was subsequently released in the United States as the third track on the ExtendedancEPlay EP.

Release
Love over Gold was released on 20 September 1982 initially on vinyl LP and cassette, and later on compact disc. "Private Investigations" was released as the lead single from the album in Europe. It reached the number 2 position in the United Kingdom, despite its almost seven minute length, Dire Straits’ first single in the UK to reach the top 5. In the United States the shortest track "Industrial Disease" was released as a single, reaching the 75 position on the Billboard Hot 100 in 1983.

The album was remastered and reissued with the rest of the Dire Straits catalogue in 1996 by Vertigo Records internationally, and in 2000 by Warner Bros. records in the United States. The remastered CD features slightly altered cover art; the album title is rendered underneath the band name, both in larger type, rather than arranged across the top. The image of lightning is also somewhat zoomed in and made brighter, making for a more purple color. It remains the only remastered Dire Straits CD with altered cover art (the U.S. remastered CD still retains the original vinyl LP art).

Love over Gold was the final album to feature original drummer Pick Withers, who left the band in November 1982 and was replaced by former Dave Edmunds / Rockpile drummer Terry Williams. Dire Straits then embarked on an eight-month-long Love over Gold Tour which finished with two sold-out concerts London's Hammersmith Odeon on 22 and 23 July 1983. In January 1983 a four-song EP titled ExtendedancEPlay was released while Love over Gold was still in the album charts. The double album Alchemy Live was a recording of excerpts from the final two concerts of the tour, and was reportedly released without studio overdubs. The concert was also issued on VHS and Laserdisc, and was remastered and released on DVD and Blu-ray in 2010.

“Private Investigations” continued to be played throughout the Brothers in Arms and On Every Street tours, while “Telegraph Road” returned to the band's set list in 1992 during the last half of Dire Straits’ final tour, and Knopfler continued to play the track during his tours as a solo artist.

Critical reception

In a retrospective review for AllMusic, Stephen Thomas Erlewine gave the album four out of five stars, noting that the addition of a new rhythm guitarist "expands its sounds and ambitions." Erlewine added, "Since Mark Knopfler is a skilled, tasteful guitarist, he can sustain interest even throughout the languid stretches, but the long, atmospheric, instrumental passages aren't as effective as the group's tight blues-rock, leaving Love over Gold only a fitfully engaging listen."

In a contemporary review for Rolling Stone magazine, David Fricke gave the album four out of five stars, calling the album a "statement of purpose" and "an ambitious, sometimes difficult record that is exhilarating in its successes and, at the very least, fascinating in its indulgences." Fricke continued:
 
Fricke praised the album's centerpiece, "Telegraph Road," which he characterized as a "challenge to the average pop fan's attention span" with its "historic sweep and intimate tension." The theme of the building of America and the dashing of one man's dreams "enable Knopfler to deploy a variety of surprising instrumental voices, from the synthesized sunrise whistle at the beginning to the baroque piano motif in the middle." Fricke concluded that "in a period when most pop music is conceived purely as product, Love over Gold dares to put art before airplay."

Track listing

 Personnel Dire Straits Mark Knopfler – lead vocals , guitars
 John Illsley – bass
 Pick Withers – drums
 Alan Clark – keyboards 
 Hal Lindes – guitarsAdditional musicians'''
 Ed Walsh – synthesizer programming
 Mike Mainieri – vibraphone (2, 4), marimba (2, 4)

 Production 
 Mark Knopfler – producer
 Neil Dorfsman – engineer
 Barry Bongiovi – assistant engineer
 Bob Ludwig – mastering at Masterdisk (New York City, New York, USA)
 Peter Cunningham – photography
 Alan Lobel – photography
 Michae Rowe – sleeve design
 Damage Management – management

Charts

Weekly chartsLove Over Gold'' spent 200 weeks in the UK Albums Chart.

Year-end charts

Certifications and sales

References

External links
 Love over Gold at Mark Knopfler's website

1982 albums
Albums produced by Mark Knopfler
Dire Straits albums
Vertigo Records albums
Warner Records albums